WROI (92.1 FM) is a radio station broadcasting a hot adult contemporary format. The station is licensed to Rochester, Indiana, and is owned by Scott Huber and Johnny McCrory, through licensee 3 Towers Broadcasting Company, LLC.

History
WROI began broadcasting August 29, 1971. It was owned by Fidelity Broadcasting Co. and aired a middle of the road (MOR) format. In 1983, the station was sold to Manitou Broadcasting for $240,000. In 1992, it was sold to Bair Communications for $250,000.

The station aired an adult contemporary format in the 1990s and early 2000s. It was branded "Lite 92.1". By 2005, WROI had adopted an oldies format. It would later shift to a classic hits format. In 2019, it was announced that the station would be sold to 3 Towers Broadcasting for $533,000. 3 Towers Broadcasting took operation of the station on August 1, 2019, and it adopted a hot adult contemporary format branded "Giant FM". The sale was consummated on November 15, 2019.

References

External links
 WROI's website

Hot adult contemporary radio stations in the United States
ROI
Radio stations established in 1971
1971 establishments in Indiana